Peter Dahlman (born  in Gothenburg, Sweden) is a Norwegian male curler and coach.

As a coach of Norwegian wheelchair curling team he participated in 2018 Winter Paralympics and 2022 Winter Paralympics.

Record as a coach of national teams

References

External links

Peter DAHLMAN - Coach profile - 2018 Winter Paralympics - International Paralympic Committee

 
 Video: 

Living people
1960 births
Sportspeople from Gothenburg
Norwegian male curlers
Norwegian curling coaches
21st-century Norwegian people